{{Speciesbox
| name =
| image = Maylandia livingstonii.JPG
| status = LC
| status_system = IUCN3.1
| status_ref = 
| taxon = Maylandia livingstonii
| authority = (Boulenger, 1899)
| synonyms = *Tilapia livingstonii Boulenger, 1899 Metriaclima livingstonii (Boulenger, 1899) Pseudotropheus livingstonii (Boulenger, 1899)
| synonyms_ref = 
}}Maylandia livingstonii'' is a species of cichlid native to Lake Malawi and Lake Malombe. This species can reach a length of  TL. It can also be found in the aquarium trade. The specific name of this fish honours the Scottish explorer and missionary David Livingstone (1813-1873).

References

livingstonii
Fish described in 1899
Taxa named by George Albert Boulenger
Taxonomy articles created by Polbot
Taxobox binomials not recognized by IUCN